The General Dynamics RIM-24 Tartar was a medium-range naval surface-to-air missile (SAM), among the earliest SAMs to equip United States Navy ships. The Tartar was the third of the so-called "3 Ts", the three primary SAMs the Navy fielded in the 1960s and 1970s, the others being the RIM-2 Terrier and RIM-8 Talos.

History
The Tartar was born of a need for a more lightweight system for smaller ships that could engage targets at very close range. Essentially, the Tartar was simply a RIM-2C Terrier without the secondary booster. The Tartar was never given a SAM-N-x designation and was referred to as Missile Mk 15 until the unified Army-Navy designation system was introduced in 1963.

The Tartar was used on several ships of a variety of sizes. Initially, the Mk 11 twin-arm launcher was used; later ships used the Mk 13 and Mk 22 single-arm launchers. Early versions proved to be unreliable. The Improved Tartar retrofit program upgraded the earlier missiles to the much improved RIM-24C standard. Further development was canceled, and a new missile, the RIM-66 Standard, was designed to replace it. Even after the upgrade to a new missile, ships were still said to be "Tartar ships" because they carried the Tartar Guided Missile Fire Control System.

A dedicated anti-ship version for the Federal German Navy carrying a Bullpup warhead was abandoned when Germany purchased MM38 Exocet instead.

Variations
RIM-24A: Original missile
RIM-24B: Improved Tartar
RIM-24C: Improved Tartar Retrofit (ITR), aka Tartar Reliability Improvement Program (TRIP)

Ships carrying Tartar fire control systems
  (Italy)
  (Italy)
  /  (Germany) /  (Australia)
 
  (guided missile modification)
  (guided missile modification)
 
 
 
 
  (guided missile modification)
 
  with Mk 13 missile launcher (retired from service)

Operators

Past Operators

Royal Australian Navy

French Navy

German Navy

Italian Navy

Japan Maritime Self-Defense Force

 Royal Netherlands Navy

United States Navy

See also
Similar missile systems
 M-1 Volna (S-125; SA-N-1 "Goa")
 Seaslug missile

External links

 General Dynamics RIM-24 Tartar
 Terrier
 NH 88489

Cold War surface-to-air missiles of the United States
Naval surface-to-air missiles
Naval surface-to-air missiles of the United States
Naval weapons of the United States
Surface-to-air missiles of the United States
Military equipment introduced in the 1960s